Phaos aglaophara is a moth in the family Erebidae. It was described by Alfred Jefferis Turner in 1926. It is found on the Australian island state of Tasmania.

References

Moths described in 1926
Spilosomina